Lord of Light is a science fantasy novel by Roger Zelazny (1967).

Lord of Light may also refer to:

 "Lord of Light", a song by Hawkwind on their album Doremi Fasol Latido (1972)
 "Lord of Light", a song by Iron Maiden on their album A Matter of Life and Death (2006)
 R'hllor, also known as the Lord of Light, a god in the A Song of Ice and Fire fantasy series (1996+)
 Lord of Light (comics), a Marvel Comics character first appearing in 1987

See also
 "Lords of Light!", a catchphrase from the animated series Thundarr the Barbarian